The Wanderings of Oisin is an epic poem published by William Butler Yeats in 1889 in the book The Wanderings of Oisin and Other Poems. It was his first publication outside magazines, and immediately won him a reputation as a significant poet.  This narrative poem takes the form of a dialogue between the aged Irish hero Oisín and St. Patrick, the man traditionally responsible for converting Ireland to Christianity.  Most of the poem is spoken by Oisin, relating his 300-year sojourn in the isles of Faerie. Oisin was not a popular poem with  modernist critics like TS Eliot. However, Harold Bloom defended this poem in his book-length study of Yeats, and concludes that it deserves reconsideration.

Story

The fairy princess Niamh fell in love with Oisin's poetry and begged him to join her in the immortal islands.  For a hundred years he lived as one of the Sidhe, hunting, dancing, and feasting. At the end of this time he found a spear washed up on the shore and grew sad, remembering his times with the Fianna.  Niamh took him away to another island, where the ancient and abandoned castle of the sea-god Manannan stood. Here they found another woman held captive by a demon, whom Oisin battled again and again for a hundred years, until it was finally defeated. They then went to an island where ancient giants who had grown tired of the world long ago were sleeping until its end, and Niamh and Oisin slept and dreamt with them for a hundred years. Oisin then desired to return to Ireland to see his comrades. Niamh lent him her horse warning him that he must not touch the ground, or he would never return. Back in Ireland, Oisin, still a young man, found his warrior companions dead, and the pagan faith of Ireland displaced by Patrick's Christianity. He then saw two men struggling to carry a "sack full of sand"; he bent down to lift it with one hand and hurl it away for them, but his saddle girth broke and he fell to the ground, becoming three hundred years old instantaneously.

Structure
The poem is told in three parts, with the verse becoming more complex with each: the lines run four (iambic tetrameter), five (iambic pentameter), and six (anapaestic hexameter) metrical feet respectively. The three "books" begin thus:

Book I:

Book II:

Book III:

See also
 List of works by William Butler Yeats

Notes

References

External links
The Wanderings of Oisin at CSUN Professor Warren Wedin Fall 2002 Graduate Seminar website
The Wanderings of Oisin at Famous Poets and Poems

The Wanderings of Oisin (LibriVox) at the Internet Archive
Short presentation (Ireland book excerpt) of The Wanderings of Oisin from the Langenscheidt website

Irish poems
1889 poems
Poetry by W. B. Yeats
Cultural depictions of Saint Patrick
Epic poems in English